Edward Ferguson (2 August 1895 – 8 February 1978) was an English professional footballer who played as a right-back. He made almost 200 appearances in the Football League for Chelsea, Ashington and Nelson. His brother, Robert, also played for Nelson.

References

1895 births
1978 deaths
English footballers
Association football defenders
Ashington A.F.C. players
Chelsea F.C. players
Nelson F.C. players
Annfield Plain F.C. players
English Football League players